William Charles Swift (born October 27, 1961) is an American former professional baseball right-handed pitcher. Swift played in Major League Baseball (MLB) for the Seattle Mariners, San Francisco Giants, and Colorado Rockies.

Scholastic career

After graduating from South Portland High School, Swift attended the University of Maine, where he played college baseball for the Maine Black Bears baseball team from 1981 to 1984, making four consecutive College World Series appearances. Swift pitched for the 1984 U.S. Olympic team.

Professional career

Following Swift’s senior year at Maine, he was a first-round draft pick (second overall selection) by the Seattle Mariners in the 1984 MLB draft, making his MLB debut with the 1985 Mariners.

In 1991, Swift was traded to the San Francisco Giants, along with pitchers Mike Jackson and Dave Burba, for outfielder Kevin Mitchell and pitcher Mike Remlinger. The Giants immediately moved Swift from the bullpen to the starting rotation, where he emerged as one of baseball’s best pitchers, leading the National League (NL) with a 2.08 earned run average (ERA) in 1992 and winning 21 games in 1993.

Between 1995 and 1997, Swift played for the Colorado Rockies. While the Rockies had high hopes for him, he struggled with a shoulder injury, back pains, and the psychological difficulties of the thin air of Colorado, and never again put up numbers comparable to his days with the Giants. Swift was eventually released by the Rockies due to shoulder trouble and triceps tightness.

In 1998, Swift returned to the Seattle Mariners. He struggled, posting an 11-9 record with a 5.85 ERA and 1.62 WHIP. Swift retired during spring training, the following season (1999).

Swift's career numbers were extremely similar to those of 1930s pitcher Bill Swift

After playing

On December 22, 1999, USA Today named Swift as one of Maine's best athletes of the 20th century. He was inducted into the inaugural class of the New England Baseball Hall of Fame on January 25, 2015.

Swift and wife Michelle have three daughters, Aubrey, Mackenzie, and Brynlie; while the children attended Scottsdale Christian Academy in Phoenix, Arizona (and for years beyond), their father coached High School Baseball for the school.

Following the end of the 2013 baseball season, Swift accepted the position of head baseball coach at Arizona Christian University; after five progressively successful seasons, he resigned following the 2018 season.

References

Further reading
 Betit, Paul. "He´s got them all making their pitch". Portland Press Herald pressherald.com. April 17, 2004.

External links

Bill Swift at SABR (Baseball BioProject)

1961 births
Living people
American expatriate baseball players in Canada
Baseball players at the 1984 Summer Olympics
Baseball players at the 1983 Pan American Games
Baseball players from Maine
Calgary Cannons players
Chattanooga Lookouts players
Colorado Rockies players
Colorado Springs Sky Sox players
Maine Black Bears baseball players
Major League Baseball pitchers
Medalists at the 1984 Summer Olympics
National League ERA champions
Olympic silver medalists for the United States in baseball
Pan American Games bronze medalists for the United States
Pan American Games medalists in baseball
Sportspeople from South Portland, Maine
Salem Avalanche players
San Bernardino Spirit players
San Francisco Giants players
Seattle Mariners players
South Portland High School alumni
Medalists at the 1983 Pan American Games